Jack Abbott may refer to:
 Jack Abbott (author) (1944–2002), American criminal and author
 Jack Abbott (coach) (1873–1918), American college football and baseball coach
 Jack Abbott (footballer) (1943–2002), English footballer
 Jack Abbott (The Young and the Restless), a character in a CBS soap opera

See also
 
 John Abbott (disambiguation)